The 2003 GP Ouest-France was the 67th edition of the GP Ouest-France cycle race and was held on 24 August 2003. The race started and finished in Plouay. The race was won by Andy Flickinger of the AG2R Prévoyance team.

General classification

References

2003
2003 in road cycling
2003 in French sport
August 2003 sports events in France